Screw (also known as Moonshine) is a card game where the players try to be the first to lose all their cards. Like Palace, it is derived from the Finnish card game Paskahousu.

Rules 
The deck is split evenly and each player is dealt four face down cards and eight hand cards. Each player chooses four of their hand cards to place face up over the face down cards: one face up card on each face down card.
Now each player has four hand cards. The player with the lowest hand card plays that card in the center. The next person may now play a card equal to or higher in value than the last played. Each player draws one card from the remaining deck each time they play a card. Multiple cards may be played at a time as long as they are the same value.
If someone will not play on the central pile, they must pick up the pile and then play any value of their choosing.
once the deck runs out players may not pick up anymore cards but must utilize the cards in their hands or pick up the deck.
A 2 is a special card; it is not a low card. Instead, a 2 "neutralizes" the value of the pile, allowing the next person to play any value card they want on the pile.
A 10 is also special; it burns the pile unless the number is greater than 10; the pile is discarded and the last to play may now play what they want.
If someone plays all of their hand cards, they may now play the face up cards they reserved from the beginning instead of their face cards.
When a player plays all their face up cards, they move on to their face down cards. They cannot look at these cards and are forced to play them at random. If the card they play is lower than the value required, they must take up the pile and again use it as their hand cards.
The first to get rid of all hand cards, face up cards, and face down cards wins the round.

Variations 
Some variations have it where when a card identical in value to the last is played, the next player in the turn order is skipped. 
A very common variation is that when four of the same value card are played in a row, then the pile automatically clears.
Another very common variation is that when someone plays a 2 they can also play another card on top of it.
Some games state that if a seven is played, the next card must be lower than the 7.
Another variation is that instead of starting with four face-down cards and eight hand cards (four of which are put down), players only start with three and six or seven respectively.
In one version called Moonshine each player is dealt three cards face up, three cards face down, and five to be held in their hand. The cards left in the deck are to be draw from keeping five cards in your hand at all times, until the remainder of the deck is gone. The special cards are 2's which neutralizes the pile, 3's which are invisible so the next player must play on whatever card is under the three, 7's which the next player must play under and 7, and 10's which clears the piles and you get to go again. A four-of-a-kind also clears the pile and allows you to go again.

Popcorn 

Popcorn is a competitive, multiplayer card game. It is a fixed variant of Moonshine. Popcorn uses a 54 card deck (standard deck of 52 plus jokers). It is named after Marvin Sutton, aka "Popcorn" Sutton, the most famous moonshiner in Western North Carolina.

As a shedding-type card game, the goal is to get rid of all your cards. The first player to do so wins the round.

A dealer shuffles a deck of 54 cards. Starting with the player to the dealer’s left and continuing clockwise, a total of three face down cards (“the basement”) are placed in front of each player, side by side. A player may not look at these cards. Next, three face up cards are dealt that cover the face down cards, forming “the porch.” Finally, the dealer deals a five card hand to each player. The remaining cards are placed on the table as the draw deck.

Play
On the first move, the player to the left of the dealer can play any single card or set (two of a kind, three of a kind, etc.) from their hand onto the table. They must then draw as many cards as it takes from the draw deck to return to a five card hand in order to end their turn.

Play continues clockwise. The next person may now play a card equal to or higher in value than the last played. Multiple cards may be played at a time as long as they are the same value. If a player is unable to play a card, they must take the entire pile into their hand.

Once all cards from a player’s hand and the draw deck are exhausted, a player may use any of the three face up cards on their “porch.” Once the three porch cards are gone, a player may use one of the face down “basement” cards.

Special rules are that:
 Playing an Ace forces you to send it to another player, leaving them to only be able to block it with a 2, Joker, or 10.
 Playing a 2 resets the value of the pile. You can then play another card or set on top.
 Playing a 7 forces the next player to play a card or set of lower value.
 Playing a 10 clears the pile - all the cards, including the 10, are discarded from play.
 A Joker is able to be used as any card.
 Four of a Kind, no matter how many players contributed, clears the pile just like a 10.

The player who plays their final card instantly wins the round.

Shedding-type card games